The 1973 OFC Nations Cup was the first Oceania-wide football tournament ever held. It took place in New Zealand from 17 February 1973–24 February 1973. All matches were held at Newmarket Park, in Auckland, and five teams participated: New Zealand, New Caledonia, Tahiti, New Hebrides (now known as Vanuatu) and Fiji.

At the time, the Oceania Football Confederation was not considered a full FIFA Confederation, and as such allowed national teams unaffiliated with FIFA to enter.

The teams played each other according to a round-robin format, and the top two teams (New Zealand and Tahiti) played off in a final to determine the winner. New Caledonia and New Hebrides also played each other, on the same day as the final, to determine third place.

New Zealand won the tournament with a 2–0 victory in the final, while New Caledonia retained third place by defeating New Hebrides.

Venues

First round

Third place play-off

Final

Goalscorers

Tournament team rankings
As per statistical convention in football, matches decided in extra time are counted as wins and losses, while matches decided by penalty shoot-outs are counted as draws.

References
 rec.sports.soccer Statistics Foundation page on Oceania Cup. Accessed 6 September 2005.
 rec.sports.soccer Statistics Foundation 1973 Oceania Cup results. Accessed 6 September 2005.

 
OFC Nations Cup tournaments
Nations Cup, 1973
OFC
Association football in Auckland
International association football competitions hosted by New Zealand
February 1973 sports events in New Zealand